Victor Prosper Considerant (12 October 1808 – 27 December 1893) was a French utopian socialist philosopher and economist who was a disciple of Charles Fourier.

Biography 
Considerant was born in Salins-les-Bains, Jura and studied at the École Polytechnique (1826 diploma). He entered the French army as an engineer, rising to the rank of captain. However, he resigned his commission in 1831, in order to devote himself to advancing the doctrines of Fourier. Subsequently, working as a musician, he collaborated with Fourier on newspapers. He edited the journals La Phalanstère and La Phalange. On the death of Fourier in 1837, Considerant became the acknowledged head of the movement, and took charge of La Phalange.

Considerant wrote much in advocacy of his principles, of which the most important is La Destinée Sociale. He authored Democracy Manifesto, which preceded by five years the similar Communist Manifesto by Marx and Engels. Considerant defined the notion of a "right to (have) work", which would be one of the main ideas of French socialists in the 1848 Revolutions. He is also known for having devised the proportional representation system. He also advocated such measures of "direct democracy" (a term he coined) as referendum and recall.

The failure of an insurrection against Louis Napoléon obliged Considerant to go into exile in Belgium in June 1849. On an invitation by Albert Brisbane and helped by Jean-Baptiste Godin, between 1855 and 1857, with his wife, Julie, and his mother-in-law, Clarisse Vigoureux, he founded the colony La Réunion in Texas on Fourier's principles.

He was a member of the First International, founded in 1864, and took part in the 1871 Paris Commune.

He died in Paris in 1893.

Contrary to a common error, his name is not written Considérant as he explained: "... there is no acute accent on my e. I have fought in vain for more than sixty years ever since my name was printed to defend it [from the accent]!"

Citations

Further reading 
 Jonathan Beecher, Victor Considérant and the Rise and Fall of French Romantic Socialism. Berkeley, CA: University of California Press, 2000.
 Carl J. Guarneri, The Utopian Alternative: Fourierism in Nineteenth-Century America. Ithaca, NY: Cornell University Press, 1991.

External links
 
 Principles of Socialism: Manifesto of Nineteenth Century Democracy by Considerant in PDF format

1808 births
1893 deaths
Forty-Eighters
Fourierists
French socialists
Members of the 1848 Constituent Assembly
Members of the International Workingmen's Association
Members of the National Legislative Assembly of the French Second Republic
People from Jura (department)
Politicians from Bourgogne-Franche-Comté
Utopian socialists